Krista McGee (born in Memphis, Tennessee) is an American young adult Christian fiction author and educator.

Bibliography

Anomaly
Anomaly (2013)
Luminary (2014)
Revolutionary  (2014)

Other novels
First Date (2012)  
Starring Me (2012)
Right Where I Belong (2012)

References

External links
 

American women novelists
American spiritual writers
People from Memphis, Tennessee
Novelists from Tennessee
Living people
American women non-fiction writers
Year of birth missing (living people)
21st-century American women